Parapeiros (also Τυθεύς - Tythefs,  - Teutheas) is a river in the western part of Achaea, Greece. The Parapeiros begins in the western part of the Erymanthos mountains close to Alepochori. It passes through the municipal units of Tritaia and Farres. It empties into the river Peiros near the village Agios Stefanos.

References

Landforms of Achaea
Rivers of Greece
Rivers of Western Greece